Kokorikha is a rural locality (a village) in Tarnogskoye Rural Settlement, Tarnogsky District, Vologda Oblast, Russia. The population was 35 as of 2002.

Geography 
Kokorikha is located 13 km southeast of Tarnogsky Gorodok (the district's administrative centre) by road. Malchevskaya is the nearest rural locality.

References 

Rural localities in Tarnogsky District